The Women's individual table tennis – Class 9 tournament at the 2020 Summer Paralympics in Tokyo took place between 25 and 30 August 2021 at Tokyo Metropolitan Gymnasium. Classes 6–10 were for athletes with a physical impairment in their upper body, and who competed in a standing position. The lower the number, the greater the impact the impairment was on an athlete's ability to compete.

In the preliminary stage, athletes competed in 2 groups of four. Winners and runners-up of each group qualified for the semifinals. In this edition of the Games, no bronze medal match was held. Losers of each semifinal were automatically awarded a bronze medal.

Qualification

Adapted from list released by the International Table Tennis Federation on 12 July 2021.

Schedule

Seeding
The total 8 players were seeded by world ranking as of August 2021.

Results
All times are local time in UTC+9.

Main bracket

Final rounds

Preliminary round

Group A

Group B

References

Women's individual - Class 9